The Jackson Senators was the name of at least two minor league baseball teams that played in Jackson, Mississippi.

First team
The first known Jackson Senators club competed in the Delta League in 1904. Jackson also played as a member of the Cotton States League before 1953. This was a class C minor-league club, and was the last team to represent the city of Jackson before the arrival of the class AA Jackson Mets for the 1975 season.

Second team
The second Jackson Senators team was a member of the independent Central Baseball League from 2002 to 2005, a league that was not affiliated with Major League Baseball.  The Senators won the CBL title in 2003. After the CBL disbanded, Jackson was left without a league for the 2006 season.

On January 24, 2006, officials with the team's ownership group, Mississippi Baseball Club LLC, announced that they would not be operating a professional independent team in Jackson for the 2006 season. Instead, the Greenville (South Carolina) Braves relocated to suburban Pearl as the Mississippi Braves.

The team played at Smith-Wills Stadium.

Notable players
Jack Mealey (born 1899) -- minor league baseball catcher, who also managed in the minor leagues and served as president of the Sooner State League

References

Defunct minor league baseball teams
Defunct baseball teams in Mississippi
Defunct Cotton States League teams
Baseball teams disestablished in 2005
Defunct independent baseball league teams
2002 establishments in Mississippi
Sports in Jackson, Mississippi
Southeastern League teams
Baseball teams established in 1953
Baseball teams disestablished in 1953
Baseball teams established in 2002
Delta League teams
Dixie League (1933 baseball) teams